The Dolomiti Superski is a ski area in Italy. Created in 1974, it is spread over an area of about 3,000 km2 in the Triveneto region of Italy, and includes most of the winter ski slopes of the Dolomites. Comprising 12 ski resorts and a total of 1,246 km of slopes, it is the largest ski area in the world. It regularly hosts World Cup alpine skiing and snowboarding races.

It offers 450 ski lifts and 1,246 kilometers of slopes, about half of which are directly connected to each other, and all of which can be used with a single ski pass. About 1160 kilometers of slopes (97%) are covered by snowmaking and skiability is guaranteed from December to April even without snowfall. It reaches an altitude of 3,269 metres in the Arabba/Marmolada area. It is located on the Dolomite mountains, which were declared a UNESCO World Heritage Site in 2009. It is an affiliate of the Ikon Pass.

Ski areas 
The area consists of 16 ski areas spread over 12 resorts:

 Cortina d'Ampezzo
 Plan de Corones/Kronplatz
 Alta Badia
 Val Gardena/Gröden
 Alpe di Siusi/Seiser Alm
 Val di Fassa
 Carezza
 Arabba
 Marmolada
 Tre Cime (since 1975)
 Val di Fiemme (since 1976)
 Obereggen (since 1976)
 San Martino di Castrozza - Rolle Pass (since 1976)
 Rio Pusteria - Bressanone/Brixen (since 1979)
 Alpe Lusia - San Pellegrino (since 1984)
 Civetta (since 1993)

Ski slopes and circuits 
The Sella Ronda and Gardena Ronda and other major ski circuits are located within the resort. Several ski courses, such as the Saslong and Gran Risa, regularly host World Cup events.

References 

Ski areas and resorts in Italy